The Music Bank Chart is a record chart on the South Korean KBS television music program Music Bank. Every week, the show awards the best-performing single on the chart in the country during its live broadcast.

As of  2023, 10 singles has reached number one on the chart, and 9 acts has been awarded a first-place trophy. Currently, "Sugar Rush Ride" by TXT has the highest score of the year so far, with 13,245 points on the February 3 broadcast.

Scoring system

Chart history

Notes

References 

2023 in South Korean music
South Korea Show Music Core
Lists of number-one songs in South Korea